Bindiya Rana is a Pakistani transgender activist. She is a member of the Khwaja Sara community and the founder and president of Gender Interactive Alliance headquartered in Pakistan. Rana ran for a seat in the provincial assembly in Karachi but lost the election.

Early life 
Rana was born into a family comprising 12 siblings. As an adolescent, she spent a significant amount of time in a dera, a place that houses trans persons. With help from her father, Bindiya rented an apartment in Karachi at the age of 15. Though hesitant and with a few obstacles at first, her family has come to support her.

Activism 
Rana is the founder and president of the Gender Interactive Alliance (GIA). Other executive members have included Rifee Khan, Rimsha and Sara Gill. The GIA has aided its trans members in availing of ID cards. Rana is a petitioner in the Sindh High Court of Pakistan for trans rights. She is one of the primary representatives of the Khwaja Sira community in Pakistan.

In 2013, Bindiya contested an election in Karachi, whereupon she was subject to a number of death threats. This was an attempt for a seat in the provincial assembly. Her gender identity created obstacles in her ability to contest elections, wherein she had to file a case in the Supreme Court. She was unable to secure a seat in the elections.

In her community, Rana is considered to be a guru, and she has over 50 apprentices or chelas. She has called out the faulty representation of trans persons in the Pakistani Census, leading to a count that was far lower than the estimate. Rana is an advocate of healthcare and is against sexual violence inflicted on trans persons. She has aided in the setup of free medical camps for women and children in the interior Sindh and Balochistan.

In 2015, Rana was involved in a protest against the lack of polling booths for trans persons for the local government polls. As a result, the trans community decided to boycott the elections.

References 

Transgender women
Pakistani LGBT rights activists
Year of birth missing (living people)
Living people
Pakistani transgender people
21st-century Pakistani LGBT people